18-year-old William Turner was lynched on November 18, 1921, for an alleged assault on a 15-year-old white girl. Two years earlier hundreds of African-Americans were killed during the Elaine Race Riot in Hoop Spur, a nearby community also in Phillips County, Arkansas.

Incident
Early November 18, 1921, a 15-year-old was walking to her work at the local telephone exchange when she was allegedly assaulted by William Turner. Before being arrested, the brother of the 15-year-old had shot Turner in the leg.

Lynching
Aware of the possibility of a lynching, Sheriff Mays tried to drive Turner to Marianna, Arkansas. However, a group of masked white men stopped the sheriff, dragged him out of the car and shot him dead. At the same time, a separate mob stormed the jail in the Phillips County Courthouse.
 
As the ambulance arrived on word of the shooting a larger mob of people pulled his body from the ambulance and shot his corpse several times. Then to chants from the mob of "Burn the body! Burn the body!" his body was doused with gasoline and set on fire. The Black paper, St. Louis Argus wrote, "after the celebrants had had their fill," they called the victim’s father, August Turner to come to the little city park to and remove his son's bullet-ridden, charred remains.

Red Summer

Two years earlier there were several incidents of civil unrest in the so-called American Red Summer of 1919. Terrorist attacks on black communities and white oppression in over three dozen cities and counties. In most cases, white mobs attacked African American neighborhoods. In some cases, black community groups resisted the attacks, especially in Chicago and Washington DC. Most deaths occurred in rural areas during events like the Elaine Race Riot in Hoop Spur, Phillips County, Arkansas (just  from Helena, Phillips County, Arkansas) where an estimated 100 to 240 black people and 5 white people were killed. Also in 1919 were the Chicago Race Riot and Washington D.C. race riot which killed 38 and 39 people respectively. Both had many more non-fatal injuries and extensive property damage reaching into the millions of dollars.

National memorial 

Featured among other things, is a sculpture by Kwame Akoto-Bamfo of a mother with a chain around her neck and an infant in her arms. On a hill overlooking the sculpture is the Memorial Corridor which displays 805 hanging steel rectangles, each representing the counties in the United States where a documented lynching took place and, for each county, the names of those lynched. According to the Equal Justice Initiative from 1880 to 1940 Phillips County had the highest rates of Lynching per year at 11.82 (Per 100,000 Residents) and had the most Lynching Victims at 245.

Bibliography 
Notes

References

 
 

 

1921 riots
1921 in Arkansas
African-American history of Arkansas
History of Phillips County, Arkansas
Lynching deaths in Arkansas 
November 1921 events
Protest-related deaths
Racially motivated violence against African Americans 
Riots and civil disorder in Arkansas 
White American riots in the United States